Neotricula is a genus freshwater snails which have a gill and an operculum, gastropod mollusks or micromollusks in the family Pomatiopsidae.

Distribution 
The distribution of Neotricula includes Hunan (at least 5 species), China, Laos (one species), Thailand and Cambodia.

Species
Species within the genus Neotricula include:
 Neotricula aperta (Temcharoen, 1971)
 Neotricula burchi (Davis, 1968)

References

External links 
 Attwood S. W., Upatham E. S., Zhang Y.-P., Yang Z.-Q. & Southgate V. R. (2004). "A DNA-sequence based phylogeny for triculine snails (Gastropoda: Pomatiopsidae: Triculinae), intermediate hosts for Schistosoma (Trematoda: Digenea): phylogeography and the origin of Neotricula". Journal of Zoology 262(1): 47-56. .

Pomatiopsidae